Albert George Schmedeman (November 25, 1864November 26, 1946) was a German American politician and diplomat.  He was the 28th Governor of Wisconsin and was U.S. Minister to Norway during the presidency of Woodrow Wilson and during the negotiations ending World War I. He was Mayor of Madison, Wisconsin, for four terms, and, to date, is the only mayor of Madison to be elected Governor of Wisconsin. He was the solitary Democratic Governor of Wisconsin between 1895 and 1959, a period when Wisconsin was more often than not essentially a one-party Republican state where third parties often provided stronger opposition than did the Democratic Party.

Biography
Schmedeman was born in Madison, Wisconsin, the son of Heinrich Schmedeman, a "Forty-Eighter" from Germany. Albert Schmedeman was elected to the Madison City Council in 1904, serving for four years.  He also served the community as fire and police commissioner, and as a member of the local board of education.

A Democrat, Schmedeman ran for a seat in the United States House of Representatives in 1910 but lost to John M. Nelson. In 1913 he was appointed the United States Minister to Norway and held this position until 1921. During that time, Schmedeman accepted the Nobel Peace Prize on behalf of President Woodrow Wilson in 1919, and was awarded the Grand Cross of the Order of St. Olaf in 1921 by Haakon VII.

After concluding his service as Minister to Norway, Schmedeman planned to retire from politics, but was, instead, elected mayor of Madison, serving from 1926 to 1932. In 1932 he was elected Governor of Wisconsin and served from 1933 to 1935. His term was both preceded and succeeded by Philip La Follette, son of former governor Robert M. La Follette Sr.

In 1934, while attending the dedication for Rib Mountain State Park and campaigning for a second term, Schmedeman slipped on some loose rock and injured his foot. Gangrene developed, necessitating the amputation of his leg.

After his service as governor concluded, Schmedeman went on to be named Federal Housing Administrator for Wisconsin by President Franklin D. Roosevelt, a post that he held from 1935 until 1942.

Schmedeman was fluent in German and also proficient in Norwegian.

References

External links
Albert G. Schmedeman, Dictionary of Wisconsin History, Wisconsin State Historical Society
Albert Schmedeman, Wisconsin History
Albert George Schmedemann [sic] at the Office of the Historian website.

1864 births
1946 deaths
American amputees
American people of German descent
Democratic Party governors of Wisconsin
Wisconsin city council members
Mayors of Madison, Wisconsin
School board members in Wisconsin
Ambassadors of the United States to Norway
American politicians with disabilities
Madison Business College alumni